For All Our Days That Tear the Heart is a collaborative album by Irish actress Jessie Buckley and former Suede guitarist Bernard Butler. Released on 17 June 2022 by EMI Records, it was preceded by the release of the singles "The Eagle & the Dove", "Seven Red Rose Tattoos", the title track "For All Our Days That Tear the Heart", and "Footnotes on the Map". The album debuted at No. 23 on the UK Albums Chart. It was shortlisted for the 2022 Mercury Prize.

Background
Prior to formally meeting, both were familiarized with each other's work. Buckley stated that she had been listening to the Butler-produced album Old Wow by folk singer Sam Lee in the downtime between rehearsals for the National Theatre’s production of Romeo and Juliet, while Butler had seen Buckley perform "Glasgow (No Place Like Home)" on an American chat show in promotion of 2018's Wild Rose. In an April 2022 interview with NME, Butler said about his first impression: "I remember clocking just how much character there was in her voice and how freely she expressed it."

The pair where first introduced to each other by Buckley's manager, who sensed they were kindred spirits. "It all started with a FaceTime call from Butler’s North London kitchen to Buckley's mountaintop residence in County Kerry, with their friendship growing from an unlikely shared love of Killarney and the small island of Valentia where Butler would go on holiday as a boy", says a statement released about the collaboration.

Critical reception

At Metacritic, which assigns a normalised rating out of 100 to reviews from mainstream publications, the album received an average score of 71 based on 4 reviews, indicating "generally favorable reviews".

The album was shortlisted for the 2022 Mercury Prize.

As of 8 September, the album had 6,497 sales.

Track listing

Charts

References

2022 albums
Collaborative albums